Robin-chat is a name given to a number of bird species:

 Cossypha
 Cossyphicula, also named the White-bellied robin-chat

Birds by common name